Jeremy Ware (born September 18, 1986) is a former American football defensive back.

Ware was drafted in the seventh round of the 2010 NFL Draft by the Oakland Raiders after playing at Michigan State University and at Lehigh Senior High School in his hometown. He played in eight games for the Raiders in 2010, recording one tackle and three passes defended. He was placed on injured reserve during the 2011 season, and was released at the end of the season.

Ware was signed by the Bears on July 28, 2012.
On August 11, 2012, Ware was waived by the Bears.

In 2015, Ware played with the Florida Tarpons of X-League Indoor Football. He was released on April 1, 2016, but re-signed with the team on April 26, 2016.

References

External links
Oakland Raiders bio

1986 births
Living people
Sportspeople from Fort Myers, Florida
Players of American football from Florida
American football cornerbacks
Michigan State Spartans football players
Oakland Raiders players
Chicago Bears players
Florida Tarpons players